The 2014 United States House of Representatives elections in Idaho were held on Tuesday, November 4, 2014 and elected two U.S. Representatives, one from each of the state's two congressional districts.

Overview
Results of the 2014 United States House of Representatives elections in Idaho by district:

District 1

Republican Raúl Labrador has represented Idaho's 1st congressional district since 2011.  Labrador won election to a second term in 2012, defeating former NFL player Jimmy Farris with 63% of the vote.

Labrador was rumored to be considering a run for governor in 2014, but has announced he will run for re-election instead.

Reed McCandless, who received 19% in the 2012 Republican primary, is challenging Labrador again.  Also running in the Republican primary are Rathdrum resident Sean Blackwell, Boise resident Lisa Marie, and Eagle resident Michael Greenway.

Although Farris initially expressed interest in a rematch against Labrador, in July 2013 he told the Idaho Statesman he was leaning towards a run for a Boise-based seat in the Idaho Legislature instead.

In August 2013, State Representative Shirley Ringo of Moscow announced she is running for the Democratic nomination. Hayden resident Ryan Barone also ran in the Democratic primary.

Primary results

General election results

District 2

Republican Mike Simpson has represented Idaho's 2nd congressional district since 1999. Simpson won reelection in 2012, defeating Democratic State Senator Nicole LeFavour with 65% of the vote.

In 2014 and 2022 Simpson faced primary challenges from Idaho Falls attorney Bryan Smith.

Former Congressman Richard H. Stallings, who represented this seat from 1985 to 1993, was the sole Democratic candidate.

Endorsements

Primary results

General election

References

External links
U.S. House elections in Idaho, 2014 at Ballotpedia
Campaign contributions at OpenSecrets

Idaho
2014
2014 Idaho elections